FC Lokomotiv-KMV Mineralnye Vody was a Russian football team from Mineralnye Vody. It played professionally in 1986–1992, 1994–1998 and 2001. Their best result was 3rd place in the South Zone of the Russian Second Division in 2001.

Team name history
 1986–1997: FC Lokomotiv Mineralnye Vody
 1998–2003: FC Lokomotiv-Taym Mineralnye Vody
 2004–2005: FC Zheleznodorozhnik Mineralnye Vody
 2006–2008: FC Lokomotiv-KMV Mineralnye Vody

External links
  Team history at KLISF

Association football clubs established in 1986
Association football clubs disestablished in 2009
Defunct football clubs in Russia
Sport in Stavropol Krai
1986 establishments in Russia
2009 disestablishments in Russia